The University of Zambia (UNZA) is a public university located in Lusaka, Zambia. It is Zambia's largest and oldest learning institution. The university was established in 1965 and officially opened to the public on 12 July 1966. The language of instruction is English.

History
The beginnings of UNZA can be traced back to before the Second World War when the idea to establish a University in Northern Rhodesia was conceived. However, plans were halted when the war broke out and only revived after. The colonial government instituted plans to set up a Central African University College, for Africa, due to the development of higher education institutions in most parts of Africa.

The Central Africa council (CAC) appointed a committee to investigate requirements for a college for higher education and, it subsequently recommended that a college for higher education be established. A subsequent investigation into the need for higher education for Africans in Central Africa was conducted by Sir Alexander Carr-Saunders in 1952, with a follow up report submitted in March 1953. The Southern Rhodesia Government accepted the establishment of a multi-racial University College and the commission consequently recommended that an institution be established in Salisbury. However, a minority report written by Alexander Kerr, provided a counter argument suggesting that the establishment of a higher education institution on the basis of equality between races was not feasible and thus recommended that a university for non-Europeans be established in Lusaka.

The political climate, as a result of the independence struggle, in the late 1950s and early 1960s made the idea of an all-inclusive University College of Rhodesia less attractive. As a result, plans to solicit support for the establishment of a higher education institution in Lusaka were initiated. In March 1963, the new Northern Rhodesia Government appointed a commission, the Lockwood Commission, led by Sir John Lockwood to assess the feasibility of setting up a university for Northern Rhodesia. The commission placed a lot of emphasis on autonomy and thus recommended the establishment of a university with no ties with already established universities in Britain. The report also recommended the establishment of the University of Zambia as a full-fledged university from the onset.

A Provisional Council of the University of Zambia was put in place after enactment of the University of Zambia Act, 1965. In July 1965, Douglas G. Anglin was appointed Vice Chancellor and, in October 1965, President Kenneth David Kaunda gave the assent of Act no 66 of the 1965 act. 

The University of Zambia was inaugurated on 13 July 1966 following the appointment of President Kenneth David Kaunda as the first Chancellor on 12 July 1966.

Following his release from prison South African anti-apartheid revolutionary and political leader Nelson Mandela addressed students at the University of Zambia in February of 1990 in his first trip abroad and first university speech since his release.

The School of Veterinary Medicine was awarded the Japanese Foreign Minister’s Commendation for their contributions to promotion of international cooperation in the technical cooperation field on December 1, 2020.

Campus

Its main campus, the Great East Road Campus, is along the Great East Road, about 7 km from the CBD. It also has the Ridgeway Campus also located within Lusaka City at the University Teaching Hospital; this campus houses students pursuing medical and pharmacological courses.

Organisation

The University of Zambia has over 157 undergraduate and postgraduate degree programmes. The University of Zambia is divided into the following faculties:

School of Agricultural Sciences

 Agricultural Economics and Extension Education
 Animal Science
 Food Science and Nutrition
 Plant Science
 Soil Science

School of Engineering

 Agricultural Engineering
 Civil and Environmental Engineering
 Electrical and Electronic Engineering
 Mechanical Engineering
 Geomatic Engineering

School of Education

 Adult Education and Extension Studies
 Advisory Unit For Colleges Of Education
 Educational Administration and Policy Studies
 Educational Psychology, Sociology and Special Education
Library and Information Science
 Language and Social Sciences
 Mathematics and Science Education
 Primary Education
 Religious Studies

School of Humanities and Social Sciences

 Development Studies
 Economics
 History
 Political and Administrative Studies
 Population Studies
 Psychology
 Philosophy and Applied Ethics
 Media and Communication Studies (formerly Mass Communication)
 Literature and Language
 Gender Studies
 Social Work and Sociology

School of Law

 Public Law
 Private Law

School of Mines

 Geology
 Mining Engineering
 Metallurgy and Material Processing

School of Medicine

 Anatomy
 Biomedical Sciences
 Physiological Sciences
 Nursing Sciences
 Medical Education Development
 Obstetrics and Gynaecology
 Paediatrics and Child Health
 Pathology and Microbiology
 Pharmacy
 Physiotherapy
 Psychiatry
 Public Health
 Surgery
 Internal Medicine

School of Natural Sciences

 Biological Sciences
 Chemistry
 Mathematics and Statistics
 Physics
 Geography
 Computer Studies

School of Veterinary Medicine

 Biomedical Studies
 Clinical Studies
 Disease Control
 Para-Clinical Studies
 Central Services and Supply

Graduate School of Business
 Business Administration
 Masters in Business Administration

Research
 The Institute of Economic and Social Research.
 The University of Zambia Library.
 The Institute of Distance Education

Affiliations
UNZA is a member of the Association of African Universities, the Association of Commonwealth Universities, and the International Association of Universities.

Notable people

References

Southern African University

 
Buildings and structures in Lusaka
Education in Lusaka
Educational institutions established in 1966
1966 establishments in Zambia
20th century in Lusaka